Le Sphinx was a maison close (brothel) in Paris in the 1930s and 1940s. Along with the "Le Chabanais" and "One-Two-Two" it was considered one of the most luxurious and famous Parisian brothels.

It was the first luxury brothel and opened on the left bank of Seine. Because of its location in the triangle of "literary" cafés (La Coupole, Rotonda and the Cafe du Dome in Montparnasse, it was popular with literary and artistic bohemians.

Inside the Brothel
"Le Sphinx" was not a brothel in the usual sense of the word. The main attraction in it was not in the richly decorated rooms with air conditioning and nickel-plated beds, but in the dance bar on the first floor, where you could also make a haircut or a pedicure. There were normally 15 girls, selected by the madame, in the bar. However, no one forced them to have sex with the clients, the girl decided themselves. Some Sphinx workers never engaged in prostitution, but worked in as "hostesses", receiving commission from drinks drunk by guests. Probably, this feature of the Sphinx made it so popular among French bohemians of that time.

 
Unlike the "One Two Two" and "Le Chabanais", the rooms of which were executed in the styles of different countries and eras, the "Le Sphinx" was completely sustained in the Egyptian style. The frescos of Le Sphinx were created by Kees van Dongen (the best brothels of the time attracted the attention of famous artists; for example, the walls of Le Chabanais and La Fleur blanche were painted by Toulouse-Lautrec).

The greatest commercial success of the Sphinx came in 1937, when the famous Exposition was held in Paris. During the exhibition "Le Sphinx" had 120 girls and in the most successful evenings took up to 1500 customers.

History

Before World War II
The initiator and inspiration for the opening of the brothel was Marthe Lemestre, nicknamed "Madame Martun".

Marthe Lemestre began her career in New York City, where during prohibition she opened a bar illegally selling alcohol. A few months before the Wall Street crash and the beginning of the Great Depression, she sold the bar, which gave her start-up capital to start a new business.

Moving to Paris, Madame Martuna decided not to convert an existing building to a brothel, as was done by the owners of "One Two Two" and "Le Chabanais", and built a new five-story mansion in the Art Nouveau style, decorating its facade with a gypsum mask of the Sphinx, from which institution and got its name.

The main investors of the brothel were French criminals Paul Carbone and François Spirito, who already had experience in organizing brothels in Marseilles and on the Cote d'Azur.

The absence of trouble with the law was guaranteed by the secret protection of the Préfet de police Jean Chiappe and Minister Albert Sarraut.

The brothel opened with great pomp on April 24, 1931, at 31 Boulevard Edgar-Quinet and was presented as the "American Bar". Guests at the opening included the Mayor of Montparnasse and his wife. The public were informed that the bar is located on the site of the former workshop of the cemetery masons, and is connected by an underground passage to the famous Parisian catacombs.

German occupation of Paris
During the German occupation, Le Sphinx, like several other luxury Parisian brothels, was requisitioned for the use of German officers, in order to prevent their contacts with the local population. The health services of the Wehrmacht were responsible for organizing the sanitary control of these establishments. Captain Haucke, commissioner of Geheime Feldpolizei, was responsible for managing prostitution in Paris.

Eva Braun and her friends were reported to have visited Le Sphinx, and Hitler supposedly ate in the brothel's restaurant in June 1940.

After World War II
In 1946, after the adoption of the "Loi Marthe Richard", the brothel was closed. The building was requisitioned to accommodate convalescent students of the Fondation de France.

In 1962, the building was demolished; the van Dongen frescoes and Egyptian interiors were destroyed.

A branch of the Banque Populaire rives de Paris now stands on the site.

La Brigade Mondaine
La Brigade Mondaine (National Police Department responsible for the surveillance of prostitution) monitored "Le Spinx" during the 1930s. Photographs were taken to monitor the clientele, and the phones were tapped. Snapshots of the hygiene record drawn up during a health check on November 10, 1936, show that the house employs 5 sub-mistresses and 65 boarders in fancy outfits. The house opened from 3 pm to 5 am, with 3 passes per woman per day during the week, 2 on Sunday, for a single rate of 30 francs plus tip.

Famous visitors
Writers: Joseph Kessel, Georges Simenon, Blaise Cendrars, Jacques Prévert, Jean-Paul Sartre, Colette, Simone de Beauvoir, Henry Miller, Ernest Hemingway, Lawrence Durrell
Artists: Moïse Kisling, Kees van Dongen
Musicians Duke Ellington
Film actors: Gary Cooper, Errol Flynn
Politicians: Albert Sarraut, Paul Reynaud
Alexandre Stavisky, the famous swindler
There is evidence that in 1932 "Le Sphinx" was visited by Eva Braun with her friends, and on 23 June 1940, during his brief visit to Paris, Hitler ate in the brothel's restaurant.

Interesting facts and legends
Since 1905, opposite "Le Sphinx", at number 16 Boulevard Edgar-Quinet, Maximilian Voloshin rented a studio. Some sources suggest that Voloshin visited the "Le Sphinx" and hired models there. This is incorrect; Voloshin left Paris long before the opening of the famous brothel.

In Literature

 "Le Sphinx" is mentioned in Henry Miller's novel Tropic of Cancer

 In 1975, the former madame of the institution Marthe Lemestre published a book of memoirs "Madame Sphinx".

 The "Sphynx" is mentioned in W. Somerset Maugham's novel The Razor's Edge (1944), when Isabel, Gray, Larry and Willie are making a tour of the tough joints in Paris, sometime in the early 1930s

See also 

 Prostitution in France
 Parisian Brothels

Other Paris brothels 1920-1940s
 Le Chabanais
 One-Two-Two
 La Fleur blanche

References

External links
 Boswell, Le Sphinx 1937 .

Brothels in Paris
Culture of Paris
Buildings and structures completed in 1931